The 1983 Pontins Professional was the tenth edition of the professional invitational snooker tournament which took place in May 1983 in Prestatyn, Wales.

The tournament featured six professional players. Two players were eliminated in the group stage, with the other four advancing to the semi-finals. All frames were played in the group stage matches even when the result had already been decided.

Doug Mountjoy won the event, beating Ray Reardon 9–7 in the final.

Group stage

  Doug Mountjoy 7–2 Tony Knowles 
  Doug Mountjoy 7–2 Dennis Taylor 
  Ray Reardon 5–4 Willie Thorne 
  Ray Reardon 6–3 Terry Griffiths 
  Dennis Taylor 5–3 Tony Knowles 
  Willie Thorne 5–3 Terry Griffiths

Knockout stage

References

Pontins Professional
Snooker competitions in Wales
Pontins Professional
Pontins Professional
Pontins Professional